Ibajay, officially the Municipality of Ibajay (Aklanon: Banwa it Ibajay; Hiligaynon: Banwa sang Ibajay), is a 3rd class municipality in the province of Aklan, Philippines. During the creation of Aklan Province in 1956, Ibajay is its biggest municipality in terms of population. According to the 2020 census, it has a population of 52,364 people making it the third most populated town in Aklan.

Ibajay is the birthplace of Col. Alejandro S. Melchor, whose design of the pontoon bridge contributed to the Allied Forces winning World War II.

History

Under the Spanish - "Panay Y Bayjay"
The autonomous barangays that the Spaniards encountered in Cebu could barely provide them with food enough for their needs. Miguel López de Legazpi had to move his camp sailing from Cebu to Panay Island in 1569.

Desiring to explore the island for food and spice, Legazpi ordered some of his men to move further on the Island until they run out of bread to eat. Tired and hungry, the Spaniards solicited something to eat from the natives. To their surprise, they were given a container full of brown rice. When the Spaniards asked the natives what kind of rice they gave, they politely replied, “ba-hay,” meaning, a third class rice. In recognition of the generosity of the natives, they named the place, “Panay y bahay” – the place in Panay where there was and the Spaniards were given “ba-hay” rice.

The word Ibajay was originally written with the capital letter Y. It was only in 1902 when an American supervising teacher made the change of Ybajay to Ibajay because of the preference to the English alphabet and the difficulty of the Americans in spelling the word.

The first seat of government by the Spanish authorities was in Boboc-on, Barangay Naile in the 17th century. The system of government that the Spaniards established was the encomienda. They rule the natives by control from a royal grant from the King of Spain. The King of Spain appointed an encomiendero as the overseer with the Governadorcillo, Cabeza Mayores and Cabezas de Barangay as subordinates.

In the early part of the Spanish dominion, the barangay was made the basic structure of government in Ibajay. The Chieftain collected tributes from his sinakupan (people) and turn over the collections to the encomienderos. Later on, however, the barangay government was reorganized again into sakups. With each has to elect a governadorcillo. The governadorcillo was elected by the votes of selected married male natives called principales. The candidate has to be recommended and nominated by the community, or by the encomiendero.

But to the eyes of the natives, the village chief was just an administrative leader. He was not an absolute ruler like the Spaniards imposed. A traditional body of customs and procedures limited the scope of his authority. Although his position had become hereditary, it was originally attained by an exhibition of greater prowess and valor, traits useful for the community's survival.

Dismayed by the exploitative nature of the government system and their unwillingness to accept the Spanish sovereignty, Chieftains Hangoe, Sandok and Kabatak fled to the vast mountains of Panay. Still, the Spanish continued their colonization. The natives could not do anything but accept the dictum of the Spaniards to survive and go on with their lives.

The first native to hold public office in Sitio Boboc-on as governadorcillo was Don Francisco Dalisay who was elected by the principales in 1673. However, Muslim pirates and bandits from Mindanao often pestered the town. Hence, in 1786, Governadorcillo Juan Sabino moved the seat of government to Sitio Maganhup, a wide land between now Barangay Naile and Barangay San Jose. The new site however, did not prove to be safe from the continued beleaguering of the lawless elements. Furthermore, it was not an ideal, area for the natives because it was far from the farms they cultivate.

Consequently, for the second time in 1792, Governador Jose Garcia transferred the seat of government to Sitio Adiango, now part of Barangay Laguinbanua. However, it only stayed there for 11 years. Capitan Josef Flores moved again the seat of government to its present location. By the decree issued by the Governador of the Philippine Islands, watchtowers were fortified along the shorelines to give warning and protection against bandits and crooks. A church was also erected.

Revolution and American influence
The Philippine Revolution broke out in the later part of the 19th century. The Tagalog Insurrectos under the leadership of Gen. Ananias Diokno defeated and drove away the Spaniards who were hiding behind the buttress of the Catholic Convent in Poblacion.

The Philippine flag was hoisted at the town square for the first time. In the year 1879, Don Ciriaco Tirol y Seneres was appointed as acting Capitan Municipal until 1898. The following year, under the revolutionary government of Gen. Emilio Aguinaldo, Don Antonio Manikan was elected Capitan Municipal. The position he held until 1901.

In 1902, The Americans reorganized the local government of Ibajay. They changed the designation of the head of the town from Capitan Municipal to Municipal President. It was also during this year that the official name of the town was changed from Ybajay to Ibajay.

The first Municipal President elected was Don Valintin Conanan. During his term, a cholera epidemic broke out in the Municipality of Ibajay. It snapped out so many lives. As a contingency, a new cemetery was opened near the Catholic Cemetery. It is now known as the Ibajay Municipal Cemetery.

In the year 1921, Catalino Solidum was appointed Municipal President. He held the position for only a year. Moises T. Solidum replaced him the following year until the year 1925. Tomas Bautista became the mayor of Ibajay from 1926 to 1928, while Jose S. Conanan from 1937 to 1940.

In 1941, Dr. Jose C. Miraflores became the mayor until the outbreak of World War II. Ibajay, that time, was razed to the ground by the Japanese troops. Many Ibayhanons suffered the painful consequences of the war. Also that time, Guerilla Liberation Movement helped to the Philippine forces became popular among the locals. Ibayhanon women formed the Ibajay Ladies Auxialliary War Relief Association (LAWRA) to raise funds and morale of the Revolutionary Army. In 1944 to 1945, started the liberation, many Filipino troops of the 6th, 61st and 62nd Infantry Division of the Philippine Commonwealth Army and the 6th Infantry Regiment of the Philippine Constabulary was liberated the town of Ibajay, Aklan and helping Ibayhanon guerrilla groups and defeating Japanese troops at the end of World War II. Moreover, the local civil government was established with Guillermo de los Reyes as acting Municipal Mayor Moises T. Solidum later on replaced him until 1946.

Geography

According to the Philippine Statistics Authority, the municipality has a land area of  constituting  of the  total area of Aklan.

Ibajay lies in the north-west section of Aklan province on Panay Island. It is bounded on the north by the Sibuyan Sea; east by Tangalan; west by Nabas and south by Antique.

Climate

Barangays
Ibajay is politically subdivided into 35 barangays.

Demographics

In the 2020 census, Ibajay had a population of 52,364.

Ibajay had a total population of 39,643 in the May 2000 census, with a calculated growth rate of 0.03%. The total number of households is 7,918 with an average household size of 5. At the 2010 census, the population had increased to 45,279 persons, a 14.2% increase since 2000.

Economy

Ibajay is classified as a third municipality (based on income). Rice farming is the major source of income. Coconut produce plays a major article for export and processing. There are 12 stationary rice mills and 21 roving rice mills for the post harvest needs of the farmers. There are 25 registered cooperatives and most of them are the Farmer's Multipurpose Cooperatives. Vegetable and livestock production are on a backyard scale. Fishing and fishpond production are done along the near coastal barangays. The center for business and trade is the Ibajay Public Market at the Poblacion. There are three barangay markets located at Barangay Naile, Maloco and San Jose.

The Ibajay Rural Bank, Inc. provides financial assistance to local traders and business entrepreneurs.

Branches of well-known local and international brands are now located in Ibajay such as Goldilocks Bakeshop, Dunkin Donuts, Bread & Butter Bakeshop, 7-Eleven, Mercury Drug, LBC Express and Andok's.

Government
Mayors and their dates of office:

 Gavino C. Solidum (1946 - 1950)
 Napoleon Mijares (1952 - 1956)
 Maximo S. Masangcay (1957 - 1959)
 Francisco Salido (1960 - 1963)
 Roberto Q. Garcia (1964 - 1967)
 Fidel G. Candari (1968 - 1971)
 Florante M. Ascano (1971 - 1987)
 Florencio T. Miraflores (1988 - 1995)
 Pedro M. Garcia (1995 - 2001)
 Roberto M. Garcia Jr. (2001 - 2007)
 Ma. Lourdes M. Miraflores (2007 - 2016)
 Jose Enrique M. Miraflores (2016 – 2022)
 Jose Miguel M. Miraflores (2022 - Present)

Tourism

Utilities
Communication and Postal Service are available through the Philippine Postal Corporation, Inc. and the Bureau of Telecommunications. A PLDT, CRUZTELCO and PANTELCO Public Calling Office provide long distance and domestic telecommunication needs of the Ibayhanons. The Aklan Cable TV and Kalibo Cable TV provide the cable television services of the town.

The electricity is provided by the Aklan Electric Cooperative, which serves about 3,862 households. Barangay Malindog purchased its own generator to provide alternative power to its residents. Barangay Aparicio and Mina-a completed the Micro-Hydro Power Plant projects and are now operational to provide electricity to the residents.

Healthcare
Health services are provided by the Ibajay District Hospital and 11 Barangay Health Stations.

Education
There are 17 Elementary Schools, 14 Primary Schools, 5 National High Schools and Aklan State University (ASU) – Ibajay Campus for tertiary education.

There are also two (2) private secondary schools. One is Ibajay Academy founded by Procopio Solidum who was hailed as the "First Filipino poet to publish poems in English" or "First Filipino-English Poet." The other one is Melchor Memorial School, founded by Dr. Rafael S. Tumbokon, in honor of the late Col. Alejandro S. Melchor, Sr.

Notable personalities

 Col. Alejandro Melchor Sr. (1900-1947) — designed the pontoon bridge contributed to the Allied Forces winning World War II / Secretary of National Defense in President Manuel L. Quezon's Cabinet / Sergio Osmeña's Military Adviser of the war cabinet

References

 Philippine History, American History, Spanish history. The outlook for the Philippines, by Charles Edward Russell. Published 11922 New York Century Co.

External links

 [ Philippine Standard Geographic Code]
 ABS-CBN Choose Philippines travelogue on Ibajay

Municipalities of Aklan